J. P. Pulliam Generating Station was an electrical power station powered by sub-bituminous coal, which could also be substituted by natural gas. It was located in Green Bay, Wisconsin in Brown County. The plant was named after the former Wisconsin Public Service Corporation president John Page Pulliam (–June 15, 1951). The plant units were connected to the power grid via 138 kV and 69 kV transmission lines. The remaining coal units on site were decommissioned in 2018 leaving only the natural gas fired P31 unit active at the site.

Units

Retirement

As a result of EPA clean air act enforcement, two coal fired units were retired at Pulliam in 2015 and WPSC was required to make $300 million in upgrades at the Weston Generating Station. Those costs were passed on to utility rate payers. At least ten positions were eliminated when Unit 5 and 6 were retired.

In 2016, WEC Energy (which purchased WPS in 2014) announced they would be retiring the remaining coal units at Pulliam due to lower natural gas prices and affordability of renewables, and they would retire the plant by the end of 2018. The plant was retired in October 2018, with most of its equipment auctioned off in March 2019. 

Some local groups expressed concern that the closure may affect local bald eagle populations due to the lack of waste heat keeping the mouth of the Fox River from freezing in the winter, and peregrine falcon populations due to the removal of nesting boxes.

See also

List of power stations in Wisconsin

References

External links

Energy infrastructure completed in 1927
Energy infrastructure completed in 1943
Energy infrastructure completed in 1947
Energy infrastructure completed in 1949
Energy infrastructure completed in 1951
Energy infrastructure completed in 1958
Energy infrastructure completed in 1964
Energy infrastructure completed in 2003
Buildings and structures in Brown County, Wisconsin
Coal-fired power stations in Wisconsin